This is a list of episodes of the American children's animated television series GoGoRiki that have been broadcast in the United States and Canada. A total of 34 episodes divided into 101 6-minute segments have been broadcast in Russia.

Series overview

Episodes

Season 1 (2008–09)

Season 2 (2009–11)

See also
 List of Kikoriki episodes

References

4Kids TV Official GoGoRiki episode guide
MSN TV GoGoRiki episode guide
Information about all episodes, organized by year & by character 

GoGoRiki
Kikoriki
GoGoRiki